The 1995 Canada rugby union tour of Fiji and New Zealand was a series of matches played in April 1995 in Fiji and New Zealand by Canada national rugby union team in order to prepare the 1995 Rugby World Cup

Results 
Scores and results list Canada's points tally first.

Additional match 
An Additional match was played the day after the test against New Zealand. A selection called "New Zealand B" played against a selection (Canada Invitation XV) formed by the Canadian players that didn't participate at the test and some New Zealand Players. The match was played on the ground of Takapuna Rugby Football Club and was won by Canadian Invitation XV by 57–54.

References

1995 rugby union tours
1995
tour
1995 in Oceanian rugby union
1995 in New Zealand rugby union
1995 in Fijian rugby union
1995
1995
April 1995 sports events in Oceania
April 1995 sports events in New Zealand